Frank Castle (second ¼ 1924 – 15 August 1999) was an English Olympic Games sprint trialist, rugby union, and professional rugby league footballer who played in the 1940s, 1950s and 1960s.

Playing career

International honours
Castle won caps for England while at Barrow in 1951 against France, in 1952 against Other Nationalities (2 matches), and Wales, in 1953 against Other Nationalities, and won caps for Great Britain while at Barrow in 1952 against Australia (3 matches), and in 1954 against Australia.

Castle also represented Great Britain while at Barrow between 1952 and 1956 against France (2 non-test matches).

Challenge Cup Final appearances
Castle played , i.e. number 5, in Barrow's 0-10 defeat by Wigan in the 1950–51 Challenge Cup Final during the 1950–51 season at Wembley Stadium, London on Saturday 5 May 1951, played  and scored a try in the 21-12 victory over Workington Town in the 1954–55 Challenge Cup Final during the 1954–55 season at Wembley Stadium, London on Saturday 30 April 1955, in front of a crowd of 66,513, and played  in the 7-9 defeat by Leeds in the 1956–57 Challenge Cup Final during the 1956–57 season at Wembley Stadium, London on Saturday 11 May 1957, in front of a crowd of 76,318.

County Cup Final appearances
Castle played , i.e. number 5, in Barrow's 12-2 victory over Oldham in the 1954 Lancashire County Cup Final during the 1954–55 season at Station Road, Swinton on Saturday 23 October 1954.

Career records
Castle is second in Barrow's all time try scorers list with 281-tries.

References

External links
Search for "Castle" at espn.co.uk
(archived by web.archive.org) Back on the Wembley trail
 Barrow RL’s great Britons
Search for "Frank Castle" at britishnewspaperarchive.co.uk

1924 births
1999 deaths
Barrow Raiders players
Coventry R.F.C. players
England national rugby league team players
English rugby league players
English rugby union players
English male sprinters
Footballers who switched code
Great Britain national rugby league team players
Leigh Leopards players
Place of birth missing
Place of death missing
Rugby league wingers
Rugby league players from Warwickshire
Rugby union players from Warwickshire
Rugby union wings
Sportspeople from Warwickshire